Secrets and Lies is a 2018 South Korean television series starring Oh Seung-ah, and . The series aired daily on MBC TV from 7:15 p.m. to 7:55 p.m. (KST) from June 25, 2018 to January 11, 2019.

Cast

Main
 Oh Seung-ah as Shin Hwa-kyung (Park Seon-joo) - The lead character of the series. Hwa-kyung is evil and her ambition will cause her own downfall. In the end, she was imprisoned for attempted murder.
  as Han Woo-jung, an aspiring announcer
  as Yoon Do-bin, MBS PD
  as Yoon Jae-bin, Do-bin's younger brother

Supporting cast

People around Hwa Kyung
Jeon No-min as Shin Myung-joon
Lee Il-hwa as Oh Yun-hee
Suh In-suk as Oh Sang-pil
??? as Oh Yun-suk

People around Woo Jung
Kim Hyeseon as Han Joo-won
Lee Joon-young as Han Woo-chul

People around Do Bin
Park Chul-min as Yoon Chang-soo
Kim Hee-jung as Heo Yong-shim
Kim Ye-rin as Yoon Sae-hee

Extended Cast
Jun Jung-ro as Secretary Min

Ratings
 In this table,  represent the lowest ratings and  represent the highest ratings.
 NR denotes that the drama did not rank in the top 20 daily programs on that date.
 N/A denotes that the rating is not known.

Awards and nominations

Original soundtrack

Track listings

Notes

References

External links
  

MBC TV television dramas
2018 South Korean television series debuts
2019 South Korean television series endings
Korean-language television shows
South Korean melodrama television series
Television series by MBC C&I